Gregorio Byington Duvivier (born 11 April 1986) is a Brazilian actor, comedian and poet. He is known by his works in film and theater, being one of the members of the comedian troupe Porta dos Fundos.

Biography
Duvivier was born in Rio de Janeiro, the son of musician and visual artist Edgar Duvivier and singer Olivia Byington, and his siblings are John, Theodora and Barbara Duvivier. He is also the nephew of actress Bianca Byington. On his paternal side, he descends from the commander Theodore Duvivier, one of the promoters of the urbanization of the neighborhoods of Copacabana and Leme (Rio de Janeiro), in the late nineteenth century. On his maternal side, the philanthropist Pérola Byington was his great-great-grandmother.

At age 9, he studied acting  at Tablado school. One year before entering college, Duvivier joined Marcelo Adnet, Fernando Caruso and Rafael Queiroga in the comedy show Z.É.- Zenas Emprovisadas. He graduated in Literature at Pontifícia Universidade Católica do Rio de Janeiro.

After being in a relationship for five years Duvivier and Clarice Falcão formally married in February 2014, however, by November that same year, ended their marriage. He identified as an atheist.

In May 2017, he and his troupe started the program Greg News inspired by HBO's own satirical news magazine Last Week Tonight with John Oliver in collaboration with HBO Latin America.

Filmography

As actor

Technical

Works
A partir de amanhã eu juro que a vida vai ser agora (2008) (7 Letras)
Ligue os pontos: Poemas de amor e Big Bang (2013) (Companhia das Letras) 
Put some farofa (2014) (Companhia das Letras)
 Percatempos - Tudo Que Faço Quando Não Sei O Que Fazer (2015)(Companhia das Letras))

References

1986 births
Living people
Male actors from Rio de Janeiro (city)
Brazilian people of Belgian descent
Brazilian people of American descent
Brazilian male television actors
Brazilian male film actors
Brazilian male comedians
Brazilian male poets
Brazilian atheists
Pontifical Catholic University of Rio de Janeiro alumni
21st-century Brazilian poets
21st-century Brazilian male writers